Faux may refer to:

People
Faux (surname)

Places

Places in Belgium
 Faux, a village in the Belgian commune of Court-Saint-Étienne

Places in France
 Faux, Ardennes, French commune of the Ardennes department
 Faux, Dordogne, French commune of the Dordogne department
 Faux-Fresnay, French commune of Marne department
 Faux-la-Montagne, French commune of the Creuse department
 Faux-Mazuras, French commune of the Creuse department
 Faux-Vésigneul, French commune of the Marne department
 Faux-Villecerf, French commune of the Aube department

Other uses
 Faux de Verzy, dwarf beech from the region of Reims, France
 Faux (river), river in the French Ardennes
 Faux (band), an English alternative rock band

See also
 Faulx (disambiguation)